Acinetobacter kookii is a gram-negative bacterium from the genus Acinetobacter which has been isolated from soil from Jeonju in Korea.

References

External links
Type strain of Acinetobacter kookii at BacDive -  the Bacterial Diversity Metadatabase	

Moraxellaceae
Bacteria described in 2013